Brian Lewis (born 18 July 1945 in Maesteg) is a Welsh former cricketer active from 1965 to 1968 who played for Glamorgan. He appeared in 37 first-class matches as a right-handed batsman who bowled off breaks. He scored 333 runs with a highest score of 38 and took 82 wickets with a best performance of seven for 28.

See also 

 List of crickets records

References

1945 births
Welsh cricketers
Glamorgan cricketers
Living people
Sportspeople from Maesteg